|}

This is a list of electoral division results for the Northern Territory 1997 General Election in Australia.

Results by electoral division

Arafura

Araluen

Arnhem

Barkly

Blain

Braitling

Brennan

Casuarina

Drysdale

Fannie Bay

Goyder

Greatorex

Jingili

Karama

Katherine

MacDonnell

Millner

Nelson

Nhulunbuy

Nightcliff

Port Darwin

Sanderson

Stuart

Victoria River

Wanguri

See also 

 1997 Northern Territory general election

References 

Results of Northern Territory elections